Tusks are elongated, continuously growing front teeth that protrude well beyond the mouth of certain mammal species. They are most commonly canine teeth, as with pigs and walruses, or, in the case of elephants, elongated incisors. Tusks share common features such as extra-oral position, growth pattern, composition and structure, and lack of contribution to ingestion. Tusks are thought to have adapted to the extra-oral environments, like dry or aquatic or arctic. In most tusked species both the males and the females have tusks although the males' are larger. Most mammals with tusks have a pair of them growing out from either side of the mouth. Tusks are generally curved and have a smooth, continuous surface. The male narwhal's straight single helical tusk, which usually grows out from the left of the mouth, is an exception to the typical features of tusks described above. Continuous growth of tusks is enabled by formative tissues in the apical openings of the roots of the teeth.

Other than mammals, dicynodonts are the only known vertebrates to have true tusks.

Function
Tusks have a variety of uses depending on the animal. Social displays of dominance, particularly among males, are common, as is their use in defense against attackers. Elephants use their tusks as digging and boring tools. Walruses use their tusks to grip and haul out on ice. It has been suggested that tusk's structure has evolved to be compatible with extra-oral environments.

Use by humans
Tusks are used by humans to produce ivory, which is used in artifacts and jewellery, and formerly in other items such as piano keys. Consequently, many tusk-bearing species have been hunted commercially and several are endangered. The ivory trade has been severely restricted by the United Nations Convention on International Trade in Endangered Species of Wild Fauna and Flora (CITES).

Tusked animals in human care may undergo tusk trimming or removal for health and safety concerns. Furthermore, surgical veterinary procedures to remove tusks have been explored to mitigate human-wildlife conflicts.

Gallery

See also 
 Fang, a long canine tooth (in mammals)
 Ivory trade
 Eco-economic decoupling

References

Mammal anatomy
Bone products
Ivory